Sunday Without God is a 2013 fantasy, supernatural Japanese anime series based on the light novels written by Kimihito Irie and illustrated by Shino. Fifteen years prior to the start of the series, it is said that God abandoned the world. Around this time human beings had lost the ability to procreate while simultaneously a pandemic known as the Half-Dead Fever gripped the world, causing twenty thousand deaths and reanimating their corpses. Since there was no sure way to grant rest to an undead person, the gravekeepers started appearing and were able to put the dead to rest using special burial rituals only they can perform. Ai Astin is one such gravekeeper, and when she meets a mysterious stranger calling himself Hampnie Hambart, she slowly starts to learn the true nature of their world.

The anime is produced by Madhouse and directed by Yuuji Kumazawa, with series composition by Tomoko Konparu, character designs by Shinichi Miyamae based on the original designs by Shino, art direction by Junko Shimizu and sound direction by Satoshi Motoyama. The series premiered on Tokyo MX on July 6, 2013 with later airings on CTC, tvk, TV Saitama, Sun TV, KBS, AT-X, TV Aichi and BS11. The twelve episode series was followed by an OVA episode on February 5, 2014. The series was picked up by Crunchyroll for online simulcast streaming. The Anime Network later obtained the series for streaming. King Records released the series in Japan on five Blu-ray and six DVD volumes between September 25, 2013 and February 26, 2014. The anime was licensed by Sentai Filmworks for distribution via select digital outlets and a home media release in North America and by Madman Entertainment in Australia and New Zealand.



Episode list

Home media
King Records released the series in Japan on five Blu-ray and six DVD volumes between September 25, 2013 and February 26, 2014. The complete series was released on Blu-ray and DVD by Sentai Filmworks in North America on October 21, 2014 and on DVD by Madman Entertainment in Australia and New Zealand on January 13, 2015.  These releases contained English and Japanese audio options and English subtitles.

Notes

References

External links
Official anime website 

Sunday Without God